Lucas Pires Silva (born 24 March 2001), known as Lucas Pires is a Brazilian footballer who plays as a left back for Santos.

Club career

Early career
Born and raised in Jabaquara, a district of São Paulo, Lucas Pires started his career with the futsal team of Nacional-SP at the age of just six. He then moved to the futsal team of Santos at the age of eight, and later joined Corinthians' youth setup, where he spent 13 years.

On 17 July 2017, Lucas Pires signed his first professional contract with Corinthians. He represented the under-17, under-20 and under-23 squads at the club, but failed to make a breakthrough in the first team. On 10 July 2021, after failing to agree new terms, he teminated his contract, which was due to expire in September.

Santos
On 20 July 2021, Lucas Pires signed a three-year deal with Santos, being initially assigned to the under-23s. The following 31 January, after impressing in the 2022 Copa São Paulo de Futebol Júnior, he was definitely promoted to the first team.

Lucas Pires made his professional debut on 2 February 2022, coming on as a second-half substitute for Felipe Jonatan in a 2–1 Campeonato Paulista away win over former side Corinthians. He made his Série A debut on 9 April, playing the full 90 minutes in a 0–0 away draw against Fluimnense.

On 31 May 2022, after establishing himself as a starter, Lucas Pires renewed his contract until May 2026.

Career statistics

References

External links
Santos FC profile 

2001 births
Living people
Footballers from São Paulo
Brazilian footballers
Association football defenders
Campeonato Brasileiro Série A players
Santos FC players